Prince Antonio of the Two Sicilies (23 September 1816 – 12 January 1843) was  a son of Francis I of the Two Sicilies and a brother of Ferdinand II  King of the Two Sicilies. Known by his title of Count of Lecce, he was killed at age 26.

Life
Antonio, Count of Lecce was the fourth son of King Francis I of the Two Sicilies and his second wife Maria Isabella of Spain. He was born on 23 September 1816 at Palermo, during the reign of his paternal grandfather, Ferdinand I of the Two Sicilies who gave him the title of Count of Lecce.  In 1830 the Count of Lecce accompanied his parents in their long trip to Spain, Italy and France when his sister Maria Christina married King Ferdinand VII of Spain. His father died few months after their return to Naples.

During the reign of his brother King Ferdinand II, Antonio quickly became known for his restless behavior. By age sixteen in 1832, he was already a consummate womanizer. In 1837, Ferdinand II arranged his marriage to Louise Marie Thérèse d'Artois, his niece, a daughter of his half sister Caroline, Duchess of Berry. The marriage negotiation failed as the Duchess of Angoulême opposed the union.

By 1842 Antonio, only twenty six, had been of frail health after overcoming repeated attacks of paralyses. On top of that, he contracted cholera from which he also recovered. He had a small house  at Giugliano that he used for his romantic adventures. His lifestyle ultimately caught up with him. He was clubbed to death on 12 January 1843 by the jealous husband of a married woman he had tried to seduce. The crime was not made public to avoid a scandal.

Ancestry

Notes

References
Acton, Harold. The Last Bourbons of Naples (1825-1861). St Martin's Press. London, 1961.ASIN: B0007DKBAO

Princes of Bourbon-Two Sicilies
1816 births
1843 deaths
Nobility from Palermo
Neapolitan princes
Sicilian princes
Italian Roman Catholics
Deaths by beating in Italy
Burials at the Basilica of Santa Chiara
Sons of kings